Triptih Agate Schwarzkobler (The Triptych of Agatha Schwarzkobler) is a novel by Slovenian author Rudi Šeligo. It was first published in 1968. Slovene Studies noted the "powerlessness of the modern subject", saying that the main character Agata is "treated as an object."

See also
List of Slovenian novels

References

Slovenian novels
1968 novels